The 2009 Virginia National Bank Men's Pro Championship was a professional tennis tournament played on indoor hard courts. It was the first edition of the tournament which was part of the 2009 ATP Challenger Tour. It took place in Charlottesville, Virginia, USA between 2 and 8 November 2009.

ATP entrants

Seeds

 Rankings are as of October 26, 2009.

Other entrants
The following players received wildcards into the singles main draw:
  Treat Conrad Huey
  Dominic Inglot
  Dénes Lukács
  Ryan Sweeting

The following player received a Special Exempt into the singles main draw:
  Gastón Gaudio

The following players received entry from the qualifying draw:
  Cory Parr
  Todd Paul
  Sanam Singh
  Fritz Wolmarans

Champions

Singles

 Kevin Kim def.  Somdev Devvarman, 6–4, 6–7(8), 6–4

Doubles

 Martin Emmrich /  Andreas Siljeström def.  Dominic Inglot /  Rylan Rizza, 6–3, 6–2

External links
Charlottesville Tennis Resorts official website
ITF Search 
2009 Draws

Virginia National Bank Men's Pro Champ
Charlottesville Men's Pro Challenger